Lee Dobyns (born c. 1935) is a former American football coach.  He served as the head football coach at McPherson College in McPherson, Kansas.  He held that position for the 1980 season.  His coaching record at McPherson was 2–7.

Head coaching record

College

References

Year of birth missing (living people)
1930s births
Living people
American football quarterbacks
McPherson Bulldogs football coaches
Rocky Mountain Battlin' Bears football coaches
High school football coaches in Montana